Adolfo Porrata Doria (born 10 May 1948) is a Puerto Rican basketball player. He competed in the men's tournament at the 1968 Summer Olympics.

References

External links
 

1948 births
Living people
Puerto Rican men's basketball players
1967 FIBA World Championship players
Olympic basketball players of Puerto Rico
Basketball players at the 1968 Summer Olympics
20th-century Puerto Rican people